A list of films produced in Japan ordered by year in the 1950s on separate pages.  For an A-Z of films see :Category:Japanese films.

1950
Japanese films of 1950

1951
Japanese films of 1951

1952
Japanese films of 1952

1953
Japanese films of 1953

1954
Japanese films of 1954

1955
Japanese films of 1955

1956
Japanese films of 1956

1957
Japanese films of 1957

1958
Japanese films of 1958

1959
Japanese films of 1959

External links
 Japanese film at the Internet Movie Database

1950s
Japanese
1950s in Japanese cinema